Pavel Vartanovich Gorelov (born 22 January 2003) is an Armenian-Russian football player. He plays for FC Van on loan from FC Rostov.

Club career
He made his debut in the Russian Premier League for FC Rostov on 19 June 2020 in a game against PFC Sochi. FC Rostov was forced to field their Under-18 squad in that game as their main squad was quarantined after six players tested positive for COVID-19.

On 24 June 2022, Gorelov joined Armenian club FC Van on a season-long loan.

International career
In May 2021, he was called up to the Armenia national under-21 football team.

Career statistics

References

External links
 
 
 

2003 births
Russian people of Armenian descent
Living people
Russian footballers
Armenian footballers
Armenia youth international footballers
Association football midfielders
FC Rostov players
FC Van players
Russian Premier League players